The Transgender Archives at the University of Victoria is the "largest transgender archive in the world".

The collection is located at the University of Victoria Libraries, Special Collections and University Archives (Mearns Centre for Learning), in Victoria, British Columbia, Canada. It is coordinated by founder and academic director Aaron H. Devor and managed by director of Special Collections and university archivist Lara Wilson.

All holdings of the Transgender Archives are accessible to the public, free of charge, for personal research, investigation, and exploration.

History
While there are numerous lesbian, gay, bisexual and trans, or LGBT, archival collections in North America, only a few exclusively feature trans, non-binary, and Two-Spirit material.

The genesis of the Transgender Archives occurred in 2005 with a conversation between the founder of the archives, Aaron Devor, and Rikki Swin. Rikki Swin is a one-time Chicago manufacturer of plastic injection moulding and founder of the Rikki Swin Institute. She moved to Victoria in 2007.

The discussion led Swin to donate her institute's entire material holdings to the University of Victoria Libraries' Archives and Special Collections. Swin's founding donation is one of three major donations held in the archives.

The second major donation of material occurred when the daughter of Reed Erickson donated her father's extensive papers to the archives. Erickson, founder of the Erickson Educational Foundation, died in 1992.

The third major donation occurred when Professor Richard Ekins donated the entire University of Ulster (Northern Ireland, United Kingdom) Trans-Gender Archive.

Officially opening in 2011, the Transgender Archives at the University of Victoria has gathered other smaller donations and has grown to be "exceptional in its focus, size, and scope" due to its unique position as being one of the only archives in the world that institutionally houses material exclusively reflecting trans, non-binary, and Two-Spirit experiences.

Libraries and the LGBTQ community lists the Transgender Archives in their List of LGBTQ Archives/Libraries/Special Collections as one of the only archival institutions that exclusively houses trans material.

Collection
The Transgender Archives at the University of Victoria contains archival material from both large and small trans organizations and focuses on the contributions of activists and researchers working for the betterment of trans, non-binary, and Two-Spirit people.

While the archive currently emphasizes collections from North America and Europe, the materials go back over 120 years, and are in 15 languages from 23 countries on six continents; if the materials were all lined up along one long shelf, the collection would stretch the length of one-and-a-half football fields.

Holdings include: approximately 2,000 books, including many rare and first editions; large collection of informational pamphlets and booklets produced by advocacy organizations for educational purposes; historical and organizational records for several significant trans activist groups including personal papers from some leaders; international newsletters from trans communities; multimedia collection representing and recording trans experience; and a large collection of ephemera.

Approximately 25 per cent of the collection is cataloged, with 60 per cent of the collection reflecting male-to-female experiences.

While the archives is accessible to the public, free of charge, key documents are slowly being made available online (see external links).

List of the archives' largest collections
 Rikki Swin
 Ari Kane/Fantasia Fair
 barbara findlay. Q.C. / Kimberly Nixon
 Betty Ann Lind
 International Foundation for Gender Education
 Merissa Sherrill Lynn
 Reed Erickson
 Stephanie Castle / Zenith Foundation
 University of Ulster TGA collection
 Virginia Prince
 Aiyyana Maracle

Publications
In 2014, founder and academic director Aaron H. Devor published the book The Transgender Archives: Foundations for the Future, featuring the collection of the Transgender Archives. The publication was a finalist in the 27th Lambda Literary Awards ("Lammys") in the category of "LGBT nonfiction".

Moving Trans History Forward conferences
Moving Trans History Forward conferences are a series of international conferences, founded and led by the Chair in Transgender Studies and the academic director of the Transgender Archives. The conferences draw community activists, researchers, educators, artists, service providers, and allies of all ages from around the world. Conferences consider the history of trans activism and research, and the issues which impact trans, non-binary, and Two-Spirit people today locally, nationally, and globally.

The first conference, held at the University of Victoria, March 21–23, 2014, was entitled "Moving Trans* History Forward".  Researchers and activists gathered to retrieve and preserve the stories and records of transgender pioneers of the early 1960s onwards.

The second conference, entitled "Moving Trans History Forward: Building Communities – Sharing Connections", took place at the University of Victoria, March 17–20, 2016. It has been hailed as the largest transgender conference in Canadian history. Trans and gender non-conforming (GNC) community-based scholars and activists, academics, archivists, librarians, family members, and allies of trans and GNC people explored preserving and recounting the history of trans and GNC people and communities in all eras and regions of the world. Events included: keynote speakers Jamison Green and Martine Rothblatt, oral presentations, posters, art exhibits, feature-length trans-themed film Two 4 One, panel discussion with founders of trans activism and research.

The third conference, entitled "Moving Trans History Forward: From Generation to Generation", took place at the University of Victoria March 22–25, 2018. The conference registered 300 people from 11 countries in Asia, Europe, North America, and the Middle East, and drew 600 people to the largest event. Kent Monkman, a Canadian Cree Two-Spirit artist, delivered one of the keynote addresses, with Andrea Jenkins, the first openly transgender black woman elected to public office in the U.S., presenting the second keynote address.

The fourth iteration of the Moving Trans History Forward conference was held online, from March 11 to 14, 2021. Originally, the conference was scheduled to take place in Victoria, BC, from April 2 to 5, 2020, at the Victoria Conference Centre but was moved online due to the COVID-19 pandemic. 379 people from 23 countries were registered for the conference. Miss Major, a long-time activist and trans women of colour, was the first keynote speaker. She was followed by Blas Radi, the cofounder of the world's second Chair in Transgender Studies. There were both youth and elder panels where speakers discussed issues faced by their respective age groups.

References

External links 
Official Transgender Archives website
Official Moving Trans History Forward conference website

LGBT museums and archives
Transgender-related mass media
University of Victoria
LGBT organizations in Canada
Archives in Canada